Escort is an American nu-disco band based out of Brooklyn, New York. Founded by Dan Balis,  Eugene Cho and Darius Maghen including (previous) lead vocalist Adeline Michèle, they are known for their modern and live dance music sound.

Founders Dan Balis and Eugene Cho met at Vassar College and started making house singles in the early 2000s. Escort started as a studio project for the duo who, "wanted to make records in the spirit of the old ones we were sampling."

Despite being a self-proclaimed disco band they "are very careful to make music that doesn't just sound and feel old, but is actually relevant for DJs and listeners today." Their first single, "Starlight", was released to critical acclaim, which led to the band being invited to make their live debut at the P.S.1 Warm Up series. A flash mob of 300 dancers coordinated a group dance to Escort's remix of Feist's "I Feel It All" in the Eaton Center in Toronto for International Dance Day. Escort's "Starlight" was featured in DSW's (Designer Shoe Warehouse) fall 2013 commercial, "Savvy Shoe Lovers."

Awards and recognition
 The video for "All Through the Night" was named as one of the top 50 videos of the 2000s by Pitchfork.
The album Escort was listed at #40 on Rolling Stone's list of the top 50 albums of 2012, saying "Up-all-night civic pride rarely sounds so fun."

Discography

Studio albums

Compilation albums

Singles

References

External links

 

Musical groups established in 2006
Alternative dance musical groups
American boogie musicians
American dance music groups
American disco groups
American funk musical groups
American house music groups
American pop music groups
American post-disco music groups
Musical groups from Brooklyn
Musical groups from New York (state)
Nu-disco musicians